Captain Charles Augustus Henry Lutyens (January 1829 – 19 May 1915) was an English soldier and painter.

Origins 
Charles Augustus Henry Lutyens was a member of a well-known military family, being the son of Major Lutyens, of Reading, who had been deputy commissioner to His Majesty's forces in the Peninsula War, and was sent to Denmark to settle the Danish claims. Four of his uncles held Army commands, and one was orderly officer at St. Helena. Napoleon was very fond of him, and left him a brace of pistols and a lock of his hair—relics which entered the possession of the family.

Military 
Following the family tradition, Lutyens entered military service, and rose to the rank of captain in the 20th Regiment (afterwards the Lancashire Fusiliers). At the age of thirty, he forsook the Army for the world of art, in order to indulge his great love and acknowledged gift for painting. Before that, however, he had distinguished himself in the Army. He was, apparently, the first man to organise musketry in the British Army, and was the first instructor of musketry at Hythe. At that time he was exceedingly keen on taking part in the Crimean War, but the authorities at first refused to allow him to go. Notwithstanding this, he persisted in his desire, and at last left for Scutari, but he was held up at Malta. Whilst on that island he invented the stadiometer, which was the first range-finder used in the British Army, and which was only superseded shortly before his death. He arrived at Scutari just as the Crimean campaign ended.

An accomplished horseman, especially in his younger days, his riding always excited the admiration and envy of experts. He hunted with practically all the best Hunts of the country in his day, being very keen on that sport.

Painting 
His paintings were well known. He exhibited at the Royal Academy for over thirty years and painted all the principal race-horses. He was an intimate friend of Landseer and of Marochetti (the sculptor, with whom he worked). Landseer was godfather to his son, Edwin Landseer Lutyens, the artist and architect, who was the designer of India's new capital. He was acquainted with all the notabilities of his time, and also met Thackeray occasionally. His travels included a tour of the States before slavery was abolished, and he saw men and women sold as slaves.

"Father of the Village" 

Since he came to reside at The Cottage, Thursley, he endeared himself to the villagers by his large-heartedness and geniality. His friendship was greatly valued by those who moved in his circle, whilst his help and sympathy to those in lower stations of life were generous. He became known as the "father of the village".

Death 
Lutyens was active in the life of the village almost up to the time of his last illness. He was a regular attendant at the Parish Church as long as he was able to walk there. The year before his death was the first occasion on which he missed his annual regimental dinner in London. He died at home on Wednesday, 19 May 1915. He was about the house on Tuesday, although he had taken a turn for the worse on the day previous, and he passed away quite peacefully at two o'clock on Wednesday afternoon. He was 86 years of age in January, and had lived in Thursley for thirty-eight years.

Family 
Captain Lutyen's wife, Mary Lutyens (née Gallwey), died at Thursley nine years before her husband. He had eleven sons and three daughters by her, and seven sons and the three daughters survived him. One son, Colonel John Lutyens, retired some time prior from the Royal Engineers. Another son, the Rev. W. E. Lutyens, was the celebrated runner of the 1890s, and his record for the 1,000 yards still held good at the time of his father's death.

Gallery

References

Sources 

 "Lutyens, Charles Augustus Henry". Benezit Dictionary of Artists. Oxford Art Online. Oxford University Press. 31 October 2011. Accessed 28 June 2022.
 "Thursley. Death of Captain C. H. A. Lutyens. An Interesting Personality". The Surrey Advertiser and County Times. Saturday, 22 May 1915. p. 12.

1829 births
1915 deaths
19th-century English painters
19th-century English male artists